North Macedonia competed at the 2020 Summer Olympics in Tokyo. Originally scheduled to take place from 24 July to 9 August 2020, the Games were postponed to 23 July to 8 August 2021, because of the COVID-19 pandemic. It was the nation's seventh consecutive appearance at the Summer Olympics and the first under the country's new name.

Medalists

Competitors
The following is the list of number of competitors in the Games.

Athletics

North Macedonia received a universality slot from the World Athletics to send a male track and field athlete to the Olympics.

Track & road events

Judo

North Macedonia entered one female judoka into the Olympic tournament after International Judo Federation awarded them a tripartite invitation quota.

Karate
 
North Macedonia received an invitation from the Tripartite Commission to send Puleksenija Jovanoska in the women's kata category to the Olympics.

Kata

Shooting

North Macedonia received an invitation from the Tripartite Commission to send a men's air pistol shooter to the Olympics, as long as the minimum qualifying score (MQS) was fulfilled by June 5, 2021.

Swimming

North Macedonia received a universality invitation from FINA to send two top-ranked swimmers (one per gender) in their respective individual events to the Olympics, based on the FINA Points System of June 28, 2021.

Taekwondo

North Macedonia entered one athlete into the taekwondo competition at the Games for the first time in history. Dejan Georgievski secured a spot in the men's heavyweight category (+80 kg) with a top two finish at the 2021 European Qualification Tournament in Sofia, Bulgaria.

Wrestling

For the first time since Beijing 2008, North Macedonia qualified one wrestler for the men's freestyle 97 kg, as a result of a top six finish at the 2019 World Championships.

Freestyle

References

Nations at the 2020 Summer Olympics
2020
2021 in North Macedonia sport